Here and Now is an American sitcom television series that aired on NBC from September 19, 1992 to January 2, 1993. The series starred Malcolm-Jamal Warner in the lead role, who prior to this series co-starred in The Cosby Show which ended its run in April 1992. Bill Cosby served as one of the show's executive producers along with Warner serving as executive consultant credited as M.J. Warner. The song "Tennessee" by Arrested Development was used as the show's theme song.

Synopsis
Alexander "A.J." James (Malcolm-Jamal Warner) is a recent college graduate who majored in psychology now attending post graduate school. He returns to his old neighborhood in Harlem to become a counselor at a local youth center. While working at the center he is living with Sydney (Charles Brown), his non-biological uncle who works as a doorman for a living. The series co-stars included S. Epatha Merkerson as Ms. St. Marth as the head of the youth center (Brenda Pressley played the role in the pilot episode), Daryl "Chill" Mitchell as T, a former delinquent now working at the center, Rachael Crawford as Danielle, Sydney's daughter, A.J's "cousin" and occasional love interest and Jessica Stone as Amy a fellow post grad student attending the same school as A.J., also working at the center. Pee Wee Love and Shaun Weiss also co-starred as A.J.'s counselees, Ramdall and William respectively.

The series bore many similarities with Warner's previous series The Cosby Show, mostly in relation to Warner's characters. Theo Huxtable on  The Cosby Show and  A.J. on this series were both psychology majors and worked at youth centers. Warner stated that difference between A.J. and Theo was that A.J. was "more hip and street wise".

Cast
Malcolm-Jamal Warner as Alexander "A.J." James
Charles Brown as "Uncle" Sydney 
S. Epatha Merkerson as Claudia St. Marth
Daryl Mitchell as T
Rachael Crawford as Danielle
Jessica Stone as Amy
Pee Wee Love as Ramdall Freeman
Shaun Weiss as William

Episodes

Broadcast history
The series aired on Saturday nights on NBC premiering on September 19, 1992 leading off the network's Saturday night lineup at the time. It was ultimately canceled on January 2, 1993 due to low ratings with two episodes unaired out of the fifteen episodes that were produced. Bill Cosby later admitted that he felt the show's cancellation was justified due to the series not being very well written.

References

External links

1990s American black sitcoms
1990s American sitcoms
1992 American television series debuts
1993 American television series endings
English-language television shows
NBC original programming
Television shows set in New York City
Television series by Universal Television